Kaafu may refer to:

Kaafu Atoll, an administrative division of the Maldives
Thaana, the seventh consonant of the Thaana abugaida used in Dhivehi